Zvonimir Stanković (born 22 November 1983) is a Serbian footballer.

Career
After spending the first years of his career in his home country with second and third level clubs FK Dubočica, FK Teleoptik, FK Proleter Zrenjanin and OFK Niš, he made his debut in the First League of Serbia and Montenegro in the 2004-05 season with FK Železnik. In the following season Stanković relocated to Macedonia in June 2005, signing a contract with FK Bregalnica Štip. From 2006 to 2009 he was a part of FK Renova, with whom earned 4 appearances, playing in the Intertoto Cup in 2008. On 16 July 2009, Bulgarian side Lokomotiv Sofia signed Stanković to a two-year deal. After playing a season and a half in Bulgarian A PFG, he returned to the Macedonian First League this time to play with FK Rabotnički where he played the second half of the 2010-11 season. In summer 2011 he returned to Serbia signing with Serbian SuperLiga club FK BSK Borča. In the following seasons he played with 2 clubs in the Serbian third league, FK Dubočica and FK Moravac Mrštane.

References

1983 births
Living people
Sportspeople from Leskovac
Serbian footballers
Serbian expatriate footballers
Association football defenders
FK Teleoptik players
FK Proleter Zrenjanin players
FK Železnik players
FK Bregalnica Štip players
FK Renova players
FK Rabotnički players
Expatriate footballers in North Macedonia
Expatriate footballers in Bulgaria
First Professional Football League (Bulgaria) players
FC Lokomotiv 1929 Sofia players
Serbian expatriate sportspeople in Bulgaria
FK BSK Borča players
Serbian SuperLiga players